Kinloss (Gaelic: Cinn Lois) is a village in Moray, Scotland.  It is located near the shore of Findhorn Bay, around 3 miles (5 km) from Findhorn and 2.5 miles (4 km) from Forres. Northeast of the village is Kinloss Barracks, formerly RAF Kinloss which opened on 1 April 1939.

It is believed that 1,000 aircraft were dismantled at Kinloss, after the end of the Second World War. Investigations are on for possible radioactive contamination in RAF Kinloss.

The Cistercian Kinloss Abbey was created in 1150 by King David. Under abbot Robert Reid the abbey became a centre of academic excellence in the 1530s. It now lies almost completely ruined.  The abbey and the town were part of the feudal Barony of Muirton.

Climate 
Like the rest of the plains of Scotland, Kinloss has an oceanic climate (Köppen: Cfb). It is one of the mildest climates in this latitude, being milder than Angoon, Alaska for almost identical latitudinal coordinates, both influenced by the location on the west coast of the temperate zone, with freezing nights on the second. Although the Scottish village is on the mainland island of the United Kingdom, its record high is also higher, demonstrating that it is not just the effect of maritime.

Education
Kinloss Primary School serves the village of Kinloss and surrounding area including the nearby village of Findhorn. 

Secondary students are in the catchment zone of Forres Academy in Forres.

See also
List of listed buildings in Kinloss

References

External links

 Findhorn and Kinloss community website
 Catholic Encyclopedia article on Kinloss's Cistercian monastery
Cistercian Abbeys: KINLOSS
Kinloss Abbey
 

Villages in Moray